The Alamo Hueco Site is a prehistoric archaeological site in Hidalgo County, New Mexico. The site was inhabited from 600 to 1350 A.D., a period which spanned the San Luis phase, the Mimbres phase, and the Animas phase. The inhabitants of the site built several adobe mounds; while the mounds have been extensively vandalized, two large mounds still contain hundreds of rooms and significant cultural deposits. Materials recovered from the site include ceramics, lithic scatters, and cobbles.

The site was added to the National Register of Historic Places on January 28, 1993.

See also

National Register of Historic Places listings in Hidalgo County, New Mexico

References

Archaeological sites on the National Register of Historic Places in New Mexico
Hidalgo County, New Mexico
Adobe buildings and structures in New Mexico
National Register of Historic Places in Hidalgo County, New Mexico
Protected areas established in 1993
1993 establishments in New Mexico